Nashville City Center is a 27-story Class A office tower in Nashville with 480,000 square foot and 800 structured parking spaces. Designed by The Stubbins Associates, Inc., it was completed in 1988. The logo for First Horizon Bank is at its peak.

The tower was purchased by Miami-based Parmenter Realty Partners for $84 million in 2008.

In March 2019, Texas-based real-estate investment firm CapRidge Partners purchased the tower for $105.3 million.

In November 2013, the tower was sold to Alliance Partners HSP LLC, an affiliate of Honolulu-based The Shidler Group for $103 million. 

The 511 Group manages the property.

Notable tenants
First Horizon Bank
Warner Music Group
Waller Lansden Dortch & Davis, LLP

See also
List of tallest buildings in Nashville

References

External links
Official Site
Emporis Listing

Skyscraper office buildings in Nashville, Tennessee
Office buildings completed in 1988